Erinaceusyllis kathrynae is a species belonging to the phylum Annelida, a group known as the segmented worms. E. kathrynaen is similar to E. cirripapillata, but lacks characteristic papillae on its cirri. At the same time, Sphaerosyllis perspicax - which according to San Martín (2005) could belong to the genus Erinaceusyllis - is also similar, but its anterior dorsal cirri are inflated at their bases; the eyes and antennae are arranged linearly, and the palps are fused along their length. This species is named in honour of Kathryn Attwood of the Australian Museum.

Description
It possesses small papillae on its dorsum and palps. Its prostomium is oval, showing 4 large eyes in a trapezoidal arrangement, as well as 2 anterior eyespots. Its antennae are spindle-shaped with bulbous bases and short tips, its median antenna similar to the combined length of its prostomium and palps. The palps are shorter than its prostomium, fused along their basal half, with a terminal notch. Its palps form a trilobed hood, possessing a few papillae.

Its peristomium measures the same as its succeeding segments, and is bilobed, forming two anterior wings that cover the prostomium dorsally. Its tentacular cirri and antennae are alike, but smaller, the dorsal cirri being longer than the tentacular cirri and shorter than the antennae, being absent on chaetiger 2. Its parapodia are conical, with few papillae.

It shows heteromorphic compound chaetae, with smooth blades or provided with straight spines. The blades are unidentate and distally somewhat hooked. Its anterior parapodia count with about 5-7 compound chaetae each, with dorsoventral gradation in length (23 to 13µm long); the posterior parapodia count with 4 compound chaetae. Erinaceusyllis kathrynae shows dorsal simple chaetae from chaetiger 1, provided sometimes with short marginal spines. The ventral simple chaetae are slender and unidentate, arising from the midbody. Its acicula is solitary and acuminate, with a rather long and filiform tip.

The pharynx is slender and spans approximately 3 segments. Its pharyngeal tooth is rhomboidal, small and placed near the opening. Its proventricle is long and wide, barrel-shaped, spanning through 3 segments, with 15-17 muscle cell rows. Its pygidium is small, with long papillae and elongate anal cirri.

Distribution

References

Further reading

External links

WORMS entry

Syllidae